Events in the year 1895 in India.

Incumbents
 Empress of India – Queen Victoria
 Viceroy of India – Victor Bruce, 9th Earl of Elgin

Events

 April - Kalugumalai riots of 1895
 1895 Birthday Honours
 Chitral Expedition

 National income - 5,371 million

Law
Government Grants Act

Births
12 January – Yellapragada Subbarow, medical scientist (died 1948).
11 September – Vinoba Bhave, freedom fighter and teacher (died 1982).
21 September- [Annapurnanand], Hindi Writer (D. 1962)
1 October- Nawabzada Liaquat Ali Khan, First Prime Minister of Pakistan, Quaid-e-Millat (Leader of the Nation) and Shaheed-e-Millat (Martyr of the Nation) (D.16 October 1951)

Full date unknown
Gokulchandra Nag, writer and artist (died 1925).

Deaths

References 

 
India
Years of the 19th century in India